Monagrillo is a corregimiento in Chitré District, Herrera Province, Panama with a population of 12,385 as of 2010. Its population as of 1990 was 8,028; its population as of 2000 was 9,549.

References

Corregimientos of Herrera Province